AM-087 (part of the AM cannabinoid series) is an analgesic drug which acts as a cannabinoid agonist. It is a derivative of Δ8-THC, substituted on the 3-position side chain. AM-087 is a potent CB1 agonist with a Ki of 0.43 nM, making it around 100 times more potent than THC itself. This is most likely due to the bulky bromine substituent on the side chain.

See also 
 AM-411

References 

Benzochromenes
Phenols
Organobromides
AM cannabinoids